The 38th Women's Boat Race took place on 26 March 1983. The contest was between crews from the Universities of Oxford and Cambridge and held as part of the Henley Boat Races along a two-kilometre course.

Background
The first Women's Boat Race was conducted on The Isis in 1927.

Race
Cambridge won by 11 seconds.

See also
The Boat Race 1983

References

External links
 Official website

Women's Boat Race
1983 in English sport
Boat
March 1983 sports events in the United Kingdom
1983 in women's rowing
1983 sports events in London